Indian Springs Wildlife Management Area is a Wildlife Management Area in Washington County, Maryland near Clear Spring. The  tract is in wooded mountainous terrain.

References

External links
 Indian Springs Wildlife Management Area

Wildlife management areas of Maryland
Protected areas of Washington County, Maryland